The 1991 Cheltenham Gold Cup was a horse race which took place at Cheltenham on Thursday March 14, 1991. It was the 64th running of the Cheltenham Gold Cup, and it was won by Garrison Savannah. The winner was ridden by Mark Pitman and trained by Jenny Pitman. The pre-race favourite Celtic Shot finished seventh.

The field included a total of five Gold Cup winners of the past, present and future. Three weeks after his victory Garrison Savannah finished runner-up to Seagram in the Grand National.

Race details
 Sponsor: Tote
 Winner's prize money: £98,578.00
 Going: Good
 Number of runners: 14
 Winner's time: 6m 50.0s

Full result

* The distances between the horses are shown in lengths or shorter. shd = short-head; hd = head; PU = pulled-up.† Trainers are based in Great Britain unless indicated.

Winner's details
Further details of the winner, Garrison Savannah:

 Foaled: 1983 in Ireland
 Sire: Random Shot; Dam: Merry Coin (Current Coin)
 Owner: Autofour Engineering
 Breeder: John McDowell

References
 
 independent.co.uk – "Garrison makes the case for the old guard" – February 10, 1995.

Cheltenham Gold Cup
 1991
Cheltenham Gold Cup
Cheltenham Gold Cup
1990s in Gloucestershire